Nyong (Daganyonga), also known as Mubako and Bali-Kumbat, is a Leko language spoken in two well-separated enclaves in Cameroon and Nigeria. Cameroonian speakers consider themselves to be ethnically Chamba.

Nyong is linguistically distinct from nearby languages. It is instead more similar to the Chamba language which is spoken to the north. Nyong and Chamba have 85% lexical similarity.

Distribution
Ethnologue (22nd ed.) lists the following Nyong villages and locations.

Cameroon
Mezam division, Santa subdivision: Baligham village
Ngo-Ketunjia division, Balikumbat subdivision: Baligashu, Baligansin, and Balikumbat villages on Ndop plain
Nigeria
Adamawa State: Mayo Belwa LGA
Taraba State: Zing LGA. 6 villages.

Phonology 
The vowels of Nyong are /i/, /u/, /e/, /o/, /ə/ /ɛ/, /ɔ/, and /a/. Length contrast exists in all vowels except /ə/ and /o/, which are always short. There are five tones: high, mid, low, rising, and falling.

References

Leko languages
Languages of Nigeria
Languages of Cameroon